Shooting Stars Sports Club (often nicknamed 3SC or Oluyole Warriors) is a Nigerian football club based in Ibadan.

History

The club was one of the founders of the Nigerian Premier League in 1972, when they were called WNDC Ibadan (Western Nigeria Development Company), and were later called IICC (Industrial Investment and Credit Corporation) Shooting Stars of Ibadan.

The nickname "Shooting Stars" was added with the suggestion of team foundation members the late Jide Johnson and Niyi Omowon the "Aare Odan Liberty" (Generalissimo of Liberty Stadium) who believed that the players were "stars" in their own right.

Shooting Stars is one of the most followed football clubs in Nigeria and play their home matches at the Lekan Salami Stadium. The stadium was named after one of the prominent supporters of the club who is now deceased. Before, "Sooting" as it is called by its supporters used to play at the famous Liberty Stadium, one of the venues for the world youth soccer championship in 1999.

Shooting stars is the first club to win the FA cup on club basis in Nigeria in 1971, players like Aderoju Omowon, Niyi Akande, Jossy Lad, Amusa Adisa were prominent in the squad. Shooting Stars is one of the most decorated clubsides in Nigeria alongside Enugu Rangers and the defunct Stationery Stores of Lagos. In fact, Shooting Stars and Enugu Rangers are known as the traditional football clubs in the country, both dominating the football scene in the country during the 1970s and 1980s.

Shooting Stars have played and won many matches against top club sides in Africa. 3SC won the first edition of CAF Cup, defeating the Nakivubo Villa of Uganda 3–0 in the finals at the Lekan Salami stadium after the first leg ended goalless. They won the African Cup Winners' Cup in 1976, becoming the first Nigerian clubside to win an international trophy.

Many well-known international stars have played for Shooting Stars in the past, including former African footballer of the year Rashidi Yekini, "the mathematical" Segun Odegbami and so on. notable players Rashidi Yekini, Segun Odegbami, Felix Owolabi, Niyi Akande, Taiwo Ogunjobi, Duke Udi, Olumide Harris, Golden Ajeboh, Ajibade Babalade, Ademola Johnson, and Jude Axelsson.

They ended their 2004–05 season in fifth place in the Premier League. After the introduction of a strange double-league format by the Nigerian Football Association, Shooting Stars got relegated to the lower division in 2006, but won promotion in 2009 after finishing second in the Division 1B.
They were relegated back on the last day of the 2017 NPFL season.
Head Coach Edith Agoye and the rest of the 3SC Management board resigned in July 2019 after they lost a promotion playoff to Akwa Starlets.

Crest

Honours
Nigerian Premier League
Champions (5): 1976, 1980, 1983, 1995, 1998
Nigerian FA Cup
Winners (8): 1959, 1961, 1966, 1969, 1971 (as WNDC), 1977, 1979, 1995
 African Cup of Champions Clubs
Runners-up: 1984, 1996
 CAF Cup
Winners: 1992
 African Cup Winners' Cup
Winners: 1976
West African Club Championship
Winners: 1998

Performance in CAF competitions
African Cup of Champions Clubs/CAF Champions League: 5 appearances
1972 – Second Round
1981 – Second Round
1984 – Runners-up
1996 – Runners-up
1999 – Group stage

CAF Cup: 3 appearances
1992 – Champion
1993 – First Round
1995 – Second Round

CAF Cup Winners' Cup: 4 appearances
1976 – Champion
1977 – Semi-finals
1978 – First Round
1980 – Quarter-finals

Notable coaches
 Alan Hawkes
 Franklin Howard
 Akintola Idowu
 Yusuf Lati
 Festus Onigbinde
 Tayo Oloniyo
 Siegfried Bahner
 Jossy Ladipo
 Fatai Amoo
 Edith Olumide Agoye

Notable players
 Segun Odegbami
 Duke Udi
 Junior Ajayi
 Abiodun Baruwa
 Mutiu Adepoju
 Mudashiru Lawal
 Ajibade Babalade
 Felix Owolabi
 Rashidi Yekini
 Idowu Otubusen (Slow Poison)

References

External links

 
Sport in Ibadan
1950s establishments in Nigeria
Sports clubs in Nigeria
Football clubs in Ibadan
African Cup Winners Cup winning clubs
CAF Cup winning clubs